Ophraella slobodkini is a species of skeletonizing leaf beetle in the family Chrysomelidae. It is endemic to the Southeastern United States. Adult males measure on average  and adult females  in total length. It is associated with Ambrosia artemisiifolia.

References

Galerucinae
Beetles of the United States
Endemic fauna of the United States
Beetles described in 1991
Articles created by Qbugbot